Mount Siegel is the highest mountain in the Pine Nut Mountains of Douglas County in Nevada, United States. It is the most topographically prominent peak in Douglas County and ranks forty-sixth among the most topographically prominent peaks in Nevada. The peak is on public land administered by the Bureau of Land Management and thus has no access restrictions.

References 

Siegel
Siegel